Hastings Stadium, officially the David E. Hastings Stadium, is a baseball park located in the Exhibition Park area of Guelph, Ontario. It is home to the Guelph Royals of the Intercounty Baseball League and the home of the Guelph Silvercreeks. It is named after a local baseball player who was active from 1943 to 1968, first in Minor Baseball and then in the Senior Intercounty league. He then went on to manage  the Guelph Junior and Senior teams until 1973. He was also mayor of Guelph, 1958–1960.

The current grandstand was built in 1987 to replace the one built in 1924. The infield was renovated in the fall of 2013 by the City of Guelph Sportsfield Department, the field underwent renovations to the outfield fencing, bull pens, and foul poles, and replacement of the scoreboard and sound system in 2017.

Stadium Dimensions
Right Field - 325 ft
Right Center Field - 393 ft
Center Field - 369 ft
Left Center Field - 403 ft
Left Field - 325 ft

References

 New athletic facilities in the city don't stay new forever

 David E. Hastings Stadium

Baseball venues in Ontario
Minor league baseball venues
Buildings and structures in Guelph
Sports venues completed in 1925